Rafael Manuel Lopez (born October 2, 1987) is an American professional baseball catcher who is a free agent. He has played in Major League Baseball (MLB) for the Chicago Cubs, Cincinnati Reds, Toronto Blue Jays, and San Diego Padres.

Career

Chicago Cubs
Lopez attended Summit Christian High School in Wellington, Florida, and Florida State University, where he played college baseball for the Florida State Seminoles. The Chicago Cubs selected Lopez in the 16th round of the 2011 Major League Baseball draft. Lopez was called up to the majors for the first time on September 2, 2014. He was optioned to the Triple-A Iowa Cubs on March 16, 2015, and designated for assignment on June 27.

Los Angeles Angels
The Cubs traded Lopez to the Los Angeles Angels of Anaheim in exchange for pitching prospect Manuel Rondon on July 3, 2015. He was released by the Angels on December 23, 2015.

Detroit Tigers
Lopez signed with the Detroit Tigers organization on January 4, 2016. He was assigned to the Toledo Mud Hens on January 12, and released on April 2.

Cincinnati Reds
On May 3, 2016, Lopez signed a minor league deal with the Cincinnati Reds. He was brought up to the major league squad on August 27. On October 10, he was outrighted off the 40-man roster to the Triple-A Louisville Bats. On November 7, 2016, Lopez elected free agency.

Toronto Blue Jays
On February 16, 2017, Lopez signed a minor league deal with the Toronto Blue Jays. On August 4, Lopez was called up to the majors to replace the injured Miguel Montero. Lopez hit his first Major League home run in a 7–6 win over the Tampa Bay Rays on August 23. He was outrighted to Triple-A on November 6, 2017, and elected free agency later that day.

San Diego Padres
On December 7, 2017, Lopez signed a minor league contract with the San Diego Padres. His contract was purchased by the Padres on March 28, 2018, and he was assigned to the Opening Day roster. Lopez was recalled from the El Paso Chihuahuas on May 1.

Atlanta Braves
On November 1, 2018, Lopez was traded to the Atlanta Braves in exchange for a player to be named later or cash considerations. On March 22, 2019, after appearing in spring training with the Braves, Lopez was assigned to Triple-A affiliate Gwinnett Stripers to begin the 2019 season. Six days later, the Braves designated Lopez for assignment. Lopez was outrighted on April 4, 2019. He elected free agency following the 2019 season.

References

External links

Florida State Seminoles bio

1987 births
Living people
American expatriate baseball players in Canada
Arizona League Cubs players
Baseball players from Philadelphia
Boise Hawks players
Bridgeport Bluefish players
Buffalo Bisons (minor league) players
Chicago Cubs players
Cincinnati Reds players
Daytona Cubs players
El Paso Chihuahuas players
Florida State Seminoles baseball players
Gwinnett Stripers players
Indian River State Pioneers baseball players
Indios de Mayagüez players
Iowa Cubs players
Louisville Bats players
Major League Baseball catchers
New Hampshire Fisher Cats players
Peoria Chiefs players
Salt Lake Bees players
San Diego Padres players
Toronto Blue Jays players
Tennessee Smokies players
Madison Mallards players